Petter Pedersen (15 June 1895 – 19 October 1929) was a Norwegian footballer. He played in two matches for the Norway national football team in 1923.

References

External links
 

1895 births
1929 deaths
Norwegian footballers
Norway international footballers
Place of birth missing
Association footballers not categorized by position